Rubens Oscar Sambueza (born 1 January 1984) is an Argentine professional footballer who plays as an attacking midfielder. In October 2013, he became a naturalized Mexican citizen.

His younger brother Fabián is also a professional footballer.

Club career

River Plate
Sambueza came up through the youth-ranks at River Plate, making his debut for the first-team on 30 November 2003 in a 2–0 loss against Lanús. He was part of the team that won the Clausura 2004 title. During his time at River Plate, Sambueza played 49 games, scoring three goals.

UNAM (loan)
For the Apertura 2007-2008 tournament, Sambueza was sent on-loan to Mexico side UNAM Pumas, being presented as their number 11, which was worn by legendary player Hugo Sánchez. He debuted in the Primera División against Guadalajara, with the match ending in a 1–1 draw. He played fourteen games in total, providing two assists and scoring two goals that season, against UANL Tigres, and most notably against Pachuca, which led UNAM to the playoffs, eventually losing in the final against Atlante F.C. The Clausura 2008 tournament saw Sambueza play sixteen matches, scoring two more goals and providing four assists. His loan with Pumas ended and was sent back to River Plate the following year.

Flamengo (loan)
In August 2008 Rubens moved, on loan, to Flamengo for a period of one year. He was assigned with the number 10 shirt, previously worn by club legend Zico, and vacant after Renato Augusto's transfer to Bayer Leverkusen. On 31 August he debuted for Flamengo as a substitute for Éverton in the Fla-Flu derby, when his club and Fluminense drew 2–2 for the Campeonato Brasileiro Série A.

Estudiantes Tecos
In the summer of 2009, Sambueza moved back to Mexico, this time to play with Estudiantes Tecos. He made his Apertura debut on 2 August in a league match against Puebla in a match which ended in a 1–1 draw. Rubens played 15 matches that tournament in total, scoring zero goals, but having three assists. It would not be until the Bicentenario 2010 tournament that Sambueza would score his first goal for Tecos, scoring on a penalty kick in a 1–1 draw against his former team, UNAM, on 14 February. He would go on to be a mainstay in the Estudiantes line-up for the rest of his time at the club, eventually playing his final match on 16 April 2012, when the team was relegated to the second division after 37 years in the top-flight, drawing 1–1 with Puebla, with Sambueza scoring the only goal for Estudiantes.

Club América

2012–13 season
On 30 May 2012 it was confirmed that Sambueza was transferred to América, reuniting him with his former manager whilst at Estudiantes Tecos, Miguel Herrera. His first match with Las Águilas came on 28 July 2012 in a 4–2 win over Jaguares at the Estadio Azteca. He scored his first goal a week later in a 2–2 draw against Atlante. He scored the following two matches against Atlas and Querétaro in a 1–1 draw and 4–0 win, respectively. He finished his first season with América playing 16 matches, scoring four goals and having three assists. In only his first tournament at the club, Sambueza was named the club's best midfielder by the fans in a social media poll, receiving 50.75% of the votes, ahead of captain Daniel Montenegro.

Sambueza started the Clausura 2013 with an assist and scored via penalty kick in a 2–1 home win against Monterrey on 5 January. On 11 January, he scored again in the 2–0 away win against Jaguares. Sambueza played in fifteen regular season matches, scoring two goals and providing six assists. He also started in both games in the final against Cruz Azul. América won its eleventh league title, and Sambuezas' first league title in Mexico.

2013–14 season
On 31 July, Sambueza assisted in Miguel Layún's goal in a 1–1 draw against Léon in América's first match of the Apertura 2013. Three days later, Sambueza would have a Man of the match performance, assisting Raúl Jiménez and scoring off a free-kick in the 3–0 victory over Atlas. Sambueza would not score again until 21 September, when he scored a goal in América's 3–1 victory over Chiapas, and 1–0 away win against Veracruz on 28 September. On 5 October, Sambueza assisted Raúl Jiménez in scoring the first goal in the 2–0 victory in the Súper Clásico match against Guadalajara. On 26 October, Sambueza scored his first brace for América in the 3–1 win over Puebla. Sambueza received plaudits for his performance throughout the tournament, being named América's best player of the Apertura 2013 by the club fans, as he received 25% of the votes.

2016-2017 season
In the Apertura Final while America paring 1-0, he was sent off for a second yellow to make the game 10 on 10, which America ended up losing on a penalty shootout. This was his last game as an America player, as he was then transferred to Toluca.

Career statistics

Club

International career
He has played for Argentina only in competitive youth games. A vital part of Miguel Herrera's Club America team, Herrera inquired about calling Sambueza up to the Mexico national football team, but he was ultimately denied due to Sambueza's history with Argentina's youth national team.

Honours
River Plate
 Primera División: Clausura 2004

América
 Liga MX: Clausura 2013, Apertura 2014
 CONCACAF Champions League: 2014–15, 2015–16

Individual
 América Midfielder of the Tournament: Apertura 2012
 América Player of the Tournament: Apertura 2013
 CONCACAF Champions League Golden Ball: 2015–16
 Liga MX Balón de Oro: 2017–18
 Liga MX Player of the Month: January 2021
 Liga MX Best XI: Guardianes 2021
 Liga MX All-Star: 2021

References

External links
 
 Argentine Primera statistics at Fútbol XXI  
 Guardian statistics
 River Plate player profile 
 Flamengo player proile 
 

1984 births
Living people
People from Neuquén Province
Argentine footballers
Argentine expatriate footballers
Argentine emigrants to Mexico
Naturalized citizens of Mexico
Mexican footballers
Association football midfielders
Club Atlético River Plate footballers
Club Universidad Nacional footballers
CR Flamengo footballers
Expatriate footballers in Brazil
Argentine expatriate sportspeople in Brazil
Barcelona S.C. footballers
Tecos F.C. footballers
Club América footballers
Deportivo Toluca F.C. players
Argentine Primera División players
Liga MX players